The 2006 Men's World Floorball Championships C-Division took place over May 3–7, 2006 in San Lorenzo de El Escorial, Spain.

The 2006 Men's World Floorball Championships were the second men's floorball championships that required a C-Division.

Championship results

Standings
Official 2006 Rankings according to the IFF

See also
2006 Men's World Floorball Championships
2006 Men's World Floorball Championships B-Division

External links
Standings & Statistics

|-style="text-align: center; background: #ffa07a;"
|align="center" colspan="3"|Men's World Floorball Championships C-Division

2006, C-Division
Mens World Floorball Championships C-division, 2006
2006 in Spanish sport
International sports competitions hosted by Spain